Sha Kok is one of the 41 constituencies in the Sha Tin District in Hong Kong.

The constituency returns one district councillor to the Sha Tin District Council, with an election every four years.

The Sha Kok constituency is loosely based on Mei Chung Court, Heung Fan Liu New Village and part of Mei Tin Estate, with an estimated population of 16,061.

Councillors represented

1985 to 1991

1991 to present

Election results

2010s

2000s

1990s

1980s

References

Sha Tin Wai
Constituencies of Hong Kong
Constituencies of Sha Tin District Council
1985 establishments in Hong Kong
Constituencies established in 1985